Olena Dvornichenko (born November 3, 1990) is an Israeli Olympic rhythmic gymnast.

Biography
Dvornichenko is Jewish, and was born in Ukraine.

She and her teammates competed on behalf of Israel at the 2008 Summer Olympics in Beijing, China, and placed 6th in the finals as a part of the Israeli National Rhythmic Gymnastic Team.

She and her Israeli teammates placed 5th in the 2009 World Rhythmic Gymnastics Championships in both Hoops and All-Around in Mie, Japan.

References

External links
 

Israeli rhythmic gymnasts
Gymnasts at the 2008 Summer Olympics
Olympic gymnasts of Israel
Living people
1990 births
Jewish gymnasts
Israeli Jews